Mount Abbott may refer to:

 Mount Abbott (Antarctica) 
 Mount Abbott (British Columbia) 
 Mount Sir John Abbott, after the second Prime Minister of Canada, Sir John Abbott (d. 1893).

See also
 Mount Abbot in California, USA